Menard High School is a public high school located in Menard, Texas (USA) and classified as a 1A school by the UIL.  It is part of the Menard Independent School District located in central Menard County.  In 2015, the school was rated "Met Standard" by the Texas Education Agency.

Athletics
The Menard Yellow Jackets compete in these sports - 

Cross Country, Football, Basketball, Golf, Tennis, Track, Softball & Baseball

State Titles
Boys Golf - 
1964(B)
One Act Play - 
1961(1A), 1962(1A), 1963(1A), 1964(1A)
Marching Band - 
2021(1A)

References

External links
Menard ISD

Public high schools in Texas
Schools in Menard County, Texas